Mary Morris (born May 14, 1947 in Chicago) is an American author and a professor at Sarah Lawrence College. Morris published her first book, a collection of short stories, entitled Vanishing Animals & Other Stories, in 1979 at the age of thirty-two and was awarded the Rome Prize in Literature by the American Academy and Institute of Arts and Letters. She has gone on to publish numerous collections of short stories, novels, and travel memoirs. She has also edited with her husband, the author Larry O'Connor, an anthology of women's travel literature, entitled Maiden Voyages, subsequently published as The Virago Book of Women Travellers. Her recent novel The Jazz Palace has been awarded the 2016 Anisfield-Wolf Award in fiction.  This award goes to work that addresses issues of cultural diversity and racism in America.

Early life
Morris was born to Sol Morris (a businessman who was a partner in his brother's architectural and engineering firm) and Rosalie Morris (a homemaker, but with a degree in fashion from the Art Institute of Chicago). They married quite late and were often mistaken for Mary's grandparents. She was raised on the North Shore of Lake Michigan in the suburb of Highland Park in Chicago, Illinois. At the time she was growing up, Highland Park was woodland and, as a child, she roamed its ravines and wandered its waterfront. Her earliest short stories are derived from these memories. She often rode horses through cornfields not far from her house. When she was sixteen, she rode a horse across Adlai Stevenson's front yard and he came out and waved. After a fairly rural childhood, she went east to attend Tufts College. Her junior year abroad in Paris in 1968 was also very informative for her writing. After college she worked at the Beacon Press for a few years, began graduate school at Harvard, but soon transferred to Columbia University in New York City where she did the bulk of her graduate work and began writing stories.

Though Morris never returned to the Midwest for very long, she often writes about the region and its tug. Many of her short stories and her early novels have been set in an imaginary town called Winona along the banks of Lake Michigan. While Morris is known for her numerous travel articles and memoirs set in far-off places, her roots remain in the Midwest. Morris likes the fact that there is more magnetism around the shores of Lake Michigan than the North Pole. She feels drawn there and has an affinity for Midwestern writers such as Willa Cather and Mark Twain who wrote their stories of the Middle West from afar. She now lives in Brooklyn, New York with her husband and daughter and teaches writing at Sarah Lawrence College.

Literary career
In her first collection of short stories, Vanishing Animals & Other Stories, Morris writes about childhood and adolescent memories. The Chicago Tribune called Morris "a marvelous storyteller-a budding Isaac Bashevis Singer, a young Doris Lessing, a talent to be watched and read."

Morris's stories often deal with the tension between home and away. Travel is an important theme in many of the stories in her collections that include The Bus of Dreams and The Lifeguard: Stories. It is also a recurrent theme in her travel memoirs, including the acclaimed Nothing to Declare: Memoirs of a Woman Traveling Alone, Wall to Wall: From Beijing to Berlin by Rail, Angels & Aliens: A Journey West and The River Queen. In her novels, including The Waiting Room, The Night Sky (formerly published as A Mother's Love) and House Arrest, Morris writes of family, its difficulties and disappointments, its iron grip and necessity, and ultimately the comfort family can bring.

Morris keeps a blog called The Writer and the Wanderer where she writes about travel and literature. The blog also contains her evocative photos and watercolors.
Her books have been translated into Italian, Spanish, German, Dutch, Swedish and Japanese. Morris is an American P.E.N. member and Fellow of the American Academy in Rome. Morris is not related to the writer Mary McGarry Morris, though she is related to the legendary publisher of the Grove Press, Barney Rosset. They are cousins.

Teaching career
In 1980 after Vanishing Animals was published, Morris received the George W. Perkins fellowship from the Council of the Humanities at Princeton University. After her year as a fellow, she taught in the creative writing program until 1993 where she was colleagues with such writers as Joyce Carol Oates (a longtime mentor and friend), Russell Banks, Paul Auster, and Haruki Murakami (who mentions Morris briefly in his memoir about running). Morris also taught a number of students who went on to illustrious careers, including Jodi Picoult (who attributes her success to Morris' mentorship), Jonathan Ames, and Elissa Schappell. She went on to teach at New York University and University of California at Irvine before becoming a tenured member of the writing faculty at Sarah Lawrence College.

Awards
National Endowment for the Arts, 1978
Rome Prize for Literature by the American Academy and Institute of Arts and Letters, 1980
Guggenheim Fellowship, 1980
Princeton University George W. Perkins Junior Fellowship of the Council of the Humanities, 1982
American Council for the Arts First Prize in Literature, 1983
The New York Foundation for the Arts - Artists Fellowship Program, 1985
Anisfield-Wolf Award, 2016

Published work

Short story collections
The Lifeguard: Stories, 1997
The Bus of Dreams: Stories, 1985
Vanishing Animals 1979

Travel
 All The Way To The Tigers, 2020
The River Queen, 2007
Angels & Aliens: A Journey West, 1999
Wall to Wall: From Beijing to Berlin by Rail, 1991
Nothing to Declare: memoirs of a woman travelling alone, 1988

Fiction
 The Lost Gold of Blue Mountain, TBA
 Gateway to the Moon, 2018 
 The Jazz Palace, 2015
Revenge, 2004
Acts of God, 2001
House Arrest, 1996
The Night Sky (formerly published as A Mother's Love), 1993
The Waiting Room, 1989
Crossroads, 1984

Short stories

References

Further reading
Hans Ostrom. "Mary Morris: Riding the Iron Rooster" (profile of Morris and review of her book, Wall to Wall), San Francisco Review of Books 16.3 (Fall 1991), p. 3.

External links

Mary's Facebook Page
Sweet Home Cook County: Mary Morris
The Writer and the Wanderer: Mary Morris' Blog
Publishers Weekly Review of The Lifeguard: The Stories

1947 births
Living people
Writers from Chicago
American women short story writers
20th-century American novelists
21st-century American novelists
American women novelists
American travel writers
American women travel writers
20th-century American women writers
21st-century American women writers
20th-century American short story writers
21st-century American short story writers
Novelists from Illinois
20th-century American non-fiction writers
21st-century American non-fiction writers